The Shaoshan 7B (Chinese: 韶山7B) is a type of electric locomotive used by the China's national railway system China Railways. This locomotive was one of China's 25-ton axle load test locomotives in the 1990s.

History 
According to the design task book issued by the Ministry of Railways in 1996, Datong Electric Locomotive Works developed SS7B Electric Locomotive. However, there were only two SS7Bs manufactured.

At first, two SS7Bs belong to Kunming Locomotive Depot, Kunming Railway Bureau, later two SS7Bs were transferred to Nanning Locomotive Depot, Nanning Railway Bureau. In 2005, SS7B-0001 was destroyed in an accident which happened in Nanning-Kunming Railway.

SS7B-0002 was transferred to Liuzhou Locomotive Depot in the spring of 2018.

Design 
SS7B is a 25-ton axle heavy freight freight electric locomotive which based on the SS7 Electric Locomotive. Two SS7Bs' each axis axle load 25 tons.

See also 
 List of locomotives in China
 China Railways SS7
 China Railways SS4C
 China Railways DF7E
 China Railways DF8B

References

External links 
 SS7B Electric Locomotive, CRRC Datong Co., LTD(English)
 SS7B Electric Locomotive, CRRC Datong Co., LTD(Chinese)

Bo-Bo-Bo locomotives
SS7B
25 kV AC locomotives
CNR Datong Electric Locomotive Co. locomotives
Railway locomotives introduced in 1997
Standard gauge locomotives of China